Nemanja Miletić may refer to:
Nemanja Miletić (footballer, born January 1991), Serbian association football player who plays for Omonia
Nemanja Miletić (footballer, born July 1991), Serbian association football player who plays for FK Partizan